S. P. Parasuram is a 1994 Indian Telugu-language action drama film directed by Ravi Raja Pinisetty. The film stars Chiranjeevi, Sridevi, Devaraj and Harish Kumar. It is produced by Allu Aravind, G. K. Reddy, and Mukesh Udeshi. S. P. Parasuram was a remake of the 1993 Tamil film Walter Vetrivel starring Sathyaraj. The film was dubbed into Hindi as Azaad Desh Ka Andhaa Kanoon and into Malayalam as Super Hero S. P. Parasuram. S. P. Parasuram is regarded as one of Sridevi's last works in Telugu film industry.

Plot 
A dangerous gang kidnaps women in various public places only to be sedated and make pornography. SP Parshuram is a brave officer who goes to any extent to maintain law and order in the city, engaging in fights with goons. A small-time thief, Kumari is almost the victim when she too is sedated but manages to escape, before looking at all the men, including the videographer Prashanth, brother of the S.P. The S.P comes on her way and she takes him to the building. He collects used syringes as a shred of evidence and hides Kumari. Prashanth is afraid that she might recognize him and reveals to the gang the place Kumari is hiding. The gang's leader fails to kill her but she goes blind due to a hit on her head.

The S.P learns of S.I Rayappa's possible involvement in the gang and thrashes him. The next day, he resigns and gets elected as Home minister of the state and puts the S.P as his security. Kumari gets her eyes operated on and recognizes Prashanth as the videographer of the pornography, without knowing that he is her husband's brother. Before the S.P can get him, the gang murders him. In the hospital, he confesses to his brother that he was forced by the gang, lest they leak the video of him with a girl. Meanwhile, his fame rises due to his sincerity towards his duty and is reflected when the public hails him over the Home Minister. The Minister tries to make the S.P put his shoe to his feet but the S.P thrashes him publicly with his shoe. After an outcry, he resigns.

When the Home Minister and the main villain hijack a train, the  S.P is infuriated and kills both of them. The police commissioner appreciates the S.P and the movie ends on a happy note.

Cast 
Chiranjeevi as SP Parasuram IPS
Sridevi as Kumari
Harish Kumar as Prasanth
Brahmanandam as Parasuram's friend
Suryakantam as Lakshmikantham
Allu Rama Lingaiah
Sharat Saxena as pornography producer
Ranganath
Sudhakar
Devaraj as Rayappa
Mahesh Anand

Soundtrack 
"Arintidaka Atta Kodaka" - S. P. Balasubrahmanyam, K. S. Chitra
"Emi Strokuro" - S. P. Balasubrahmanyam, K. S. Chitra
"Champeyi Guru" - S. P. Balasubrahmanyam, K. S. Chitra
"O Baba Kiss Me" - S. P. Balasubrahmanyam, K. S. Chitra, Miss 420
"Yedavaku Yedavaku" - K. S. Chitra
"Muddabanti" - S. P. Balasubrahmanyam, K. S. Chitra

References

External links 
 

1994 films
1990s Telugu-language films
Indian action films
Telugu remakes of Tamil films
Films scored by M. M. Keeravani
Fictional portrayals of the Andhra Pradesh Police
Indian police films
Fictional Indian police officers
Films shot in Hyderabad, India
Films shot in Switzerland
Films directed by Ravi Raja Pinisetty
1994 action films
1990s police films